Frederick K. Engle (October 24, 1797 – February 12, 1868) was a rear admiral of the United States Navy.

Early life and career
Engle was born in Chester, Delaware County, Pennsylvania. He entered the navy as a midshipman on November 30, 1814, and became lieutenant on January 13, 1825.

He was then assigned to the command of the Philadelphia Naval Shipyard, and subsequently became governor of the naval asylum in that City. He was promoted to rear admiral on the retired list on July 25, 1866.

Engle died in Philadelphia on February 12, 1868. He is buried at St. Mary's Episcopal Church in Burlington, NJ.

Notes

References
 

1799 births
1868 deaths
Union Navy officers
United States Navy rear admirals (upper half)
People from Chester, Pennsylvania
People from Delaware County, Pennsylvania
American military personnel of the Mexican–American War
People of Pennsylvania in the American Civil War